Danny Nykoluk (June 16, 1933 – July 29, 2016) was a professional football player with the Canadian Football League's Toronto Argonauts. Nykoluk primarily played the offensive tackle position with the Argos.

Nykoluk played in 204 games with the Argonauts in a career that lasted 16 seasons. His #60 jersey is one of only four that has been retired by the club. In 1996, Nykoluk was inducted as an All-Time Argonaut with a banner named in his honour raised at Rogers Centre.

Danny Nykoluk was the older brother of former Toronto Maple Leafs ice hockey player and NHL coach, Mike Nykoluk.

He died in Oshawa on 29 July 2016 at the age of 83.

References

External links 
"Casualty of gridiron warfare" (Steve Simmons column on Slam.ca)
CFLapedia bio

1933 births
2016 deaths
Canadian football offensive linemen
Canadian people of Ukrainian descent
Ontario Rugby Football Union players
Players of Canadian football from Ontario
Canadian football people from Toronto
Toronto Argonauts players
Toronto Balmy Beach Beachers players